Mollet del Vallès is a municipality in the comarca of the Vallès Oriental in  Catalonia, Spain. It is situated in the valley of the Besòs river, and is an important communications hub from Barcelona towards the north: the AP-7 Motorway passes through the municipality, as do the RENFE railway lines to Vic and Puigcerdà and to Girona and Portbou. The town is also served by the C-17 highway (formerly N-152).

Mollet del Vallès has a number of buildings in the modernista and noucentista styles. The studio-museum of the painter Abelló displays modern Catalan art.

Shooting at the 1992 Summer Olympics was carried out in Mollet del Vallès; the range has been reused for the 1998 ISSF World Shooting Championships.

Tha flag is a horizontal tricolour, in the proportion 2:1:1, of white, red, and white, and has a red mullus (a goatfish) on the broad upper stripe.

History

10th century 
In the middle of the 10th century, Mollet was a little center of population that depended on the bishop of Barcelona.

12th century 
Of the medieval past of Mollet, there is only remaining the Romanesque church of Santa Maria de Gallecs

From 15th to 18th centuries 
Mollet (which back then also included Parets) didn't raise the population until the 17th century, then, a new church was built, but as ruling a town with 3 churches was hard, there were constant conflicts, which concluded with the separation of Parets.

Sites of interest

St Fost's Church
The Abelló Museum
The Abelló Museum is a municipal art museum located in Mollet del Vallès, in El Vallès Oriental.[1] Opened on 29 March 1999, its principal collection comprises pieces from artist and collector Joan Abelló, which donated his collection to the city in 1996, creating the Joan Abelló Foundation, an independent organisation of the Mollet del Vallès Town Council. The museum is located in an Art Nouveau-style building from 1908, of which only the façade has been preserved.
The old Market

Notable people 
 Alexia Putellas, midfielder for FC Barcelona Femení and Spain women's national football team
 Joan Abelló i Prat, artist (1922-2008)
 Josep Maria Pou i Serra, actor and cinema director, teatre i televisió (1944)
 Josep Solà i Sánchez, musician (1930-2009)
 Jordi Solé i Tura, politician and founder of the Spanish Constitution of 1978 (1930-2009)
 Montserrat Tura, politician (1954)
 Mojinos Escozíos, music group founded in Mollet, where some of its members live.
 Anna Simon i Marí, journalist (1982)

Twin towns
 Rivoli, Italy
 Cinco Pinos, Nicaragua
 Ravensburg, Germany

References

 Panareda Clopés, Josep Maria; Rios Calvet, Jaume; Rabella Vives, Josep Maria (1989). Guia de Catalunya, Barcelona:Caixa de Catalunya.  (Spanish).  (Catalan).

External links 

 Official website City Council
 Official Municipality Guide
 Government data pages 

Municipalities in Vallès Oriental